Waddington is an Olde English surname of Anglo-Saxon English origin. It is thought to derive from the Old English pre 7th Century personal name "Wada", plus "-ing", meaning the tribe or people of", and "tun or ham", a settlement; and hence, "The settlement of the Wada people". It may be connected to be connected with the pre-7th century Old English name "Wade", and the verb "wadan" (wada) meaning "to go", or as a habitational name from the Old English word "(ge)waed" meaning "ford".

Origins and variants 
Wadington, Waddington, Wodington, Wadiham, Wadyngton, and Waddingham, this is an English locational surname, derived from the Olde English name Wadingtun or Wadingatun. It originates from any or all of the villages called Waddington in Lincolnshire and the West Riding of Yorkshire, and Waddiham in Lincoln. Waditun (Waddington) an ancient hamlet at Craven in Yorkshire (quoted in Domesday Book A.D. 1086 as Widitun). When Surnames were first adopted, some 1,000 years ago, it was in or near this Hamlet or Village that the ancestors of all those who now bear its name (Waddington) resided and are of the Divine Stock of Woden." The surname Waddington was first found in Yorkshire where they were Lords of the manor of Waddington, a village and parish near Clitheroe. "It is natural to find the name crossing the border into Lancashire. This surname has ramified very strongly in the Northern counties." Indeed another source claims the family did in fact originate in Lancashire: "The Waddingtons, who are also established in Lancashire, have their principal home in the West Riding, where occur a village and a seat of the name." The Canterbury Journal states : "The Waddingtons are, we have heard, of Saxon origin, being like the "Guelphs" lineal descendants from the renowned "Woden" (70 B.c.) as also from the Ferrands of Gas-cony, a house which in the 12th century gave Kings to Portugal."

Wada Dux 
The Ancient clan chief Odin (b. circa 210 AD), Woutan or Woden, was treated like a God by the Northern Races. The Historical Odin was chief of the AEsir Tribe, who were based in Sweden. His sons became the Kings of Norway, Sweden, Denmark and Germany. Descendant of Odin (Wodin/Waegdaeg/Wihtlaeg/Witta/Wihtgils/Hengest/Hartwake/Hattwigate/Hulderic/Bodic/Bertold/Sighard/Dieteric/Wernicke) was Wada Dux; an Anglo Saxon Chief of Lancashire and Yorkshire, and founder of the Township of Waddington and from whom the name of Waddington is derived. The name signified the town (ton) of the children (ing) of Wada. Wada's Father was said to be King Wernicke (sometimes written as Warnechin, Warnikind, Vellikinus), 10th King of Saxony. His Brother is said to be the famous clan leader Wudikind, who fought Charlemagne. Eardwulf of Northumbria fought a battle at Billington Moor against a nobleman named Wada in 798 AD, who had been one of those who killed King Æthelred I of Northumbria.The Waddington name may be traced in such places as "Wad-how, Wadsworth, Paddington, and strange as it may seem, in Padiham, the abode of Wada, since Pada and Wada were only variations of the same word. Their possessions extended over a large part of Yorkshire and Lancashire",

In 798 A.D. Wada Dux and his wife Bell had issue son called Wade (Wada). The principal seat of the Waddingtons was at Waddington, near Clitheroe.  Chief of the region circa 1187 AD was Walter Wadingaton and his wife Goda. Their son, also named Walter, had several children including Alice; who would go on to marry Sir Roger Tempest of Bracewell. Lands belonging to, or leased from land owners or the King by the Waddington family included Slaidburn, Bolton-by-Boland, Downham, Rimmington, Barshall Eaves, Chaigley, Edisford, Read, Padham, Altham, Clayton-le-Moors, Rishton, Accrington, Haslingden and Hoddlesden.

Notable Waddingtons of Waddington 
 Walter de Wadyngton (1217-1293), married Goda, son (Walter) had a daughter Alice (Tempest) 
 Thomas de Wadyngton, appointment (1348) by Sir John Tempest Knight as Lord of the Village of Wadyngton
 Walter de Wadyngton (1340-1356), fought at the Battle of Poitiers
 Thomas de Wadyngton (1350-1400), went to Ireland on the King's service in the company with John de Stanley, supplying Robert, Marquis of Dublin
 Robert Waddington (1415-1480), inherited Hoddlesden, New Hay (near Hoddlesden) Hacking, Grimshaw, and Oakenshaw (Clayton-le-Moores); which was assured by the payment of £20 by Geoffrey Grimshaw (presumed his brother-in-law)
 Thomas Waddington (1450-1530), married Alice Towneley of Towneley Hall. Held estates in Rishton, Burnley, Worston, Edisforth, Extwistle, Broad Holden (Haslingden) and Simonstone. In 1517 he transferred the lands Scaytcliff (Scaitcliffe) and Peneworth (Accrington) to Nicholas Rishton and to his Son Geoffrey. 
 Reynold Waddington (1485-1543), Greave of Haslingden and Ightenhill 
 Henry Waddington (1490-1550), in 1509 vs Vicar Henry Salley; over Estate of Hakking (in Blackburn); was given Lands in Rodland and Typynhill in Hightenhill. Ightenhill spans the River Calder to the north of Padiham and includes Gawthorpe Hall 
 Thomas Waddington (1493-1591), (in 1549) elected Greave for Clitheroe,

Notable people and fictional characters with the surname 
 Abe Waddington (1893–1959), English cricketer
 Alfred Waddington (1801–72), colonial entrepreneur in British Columbia, Canada
 Andrucha Waddington (born 1970), Brazilian film director 
 Bill Waddington (1916–2000), British actor
 Charles Waddington (disambiguation), various people of this name:
 Charles Waddington (East India Company officer) (1796–1858), major-general Bombay engineers
 Charles Waddington (philosopher) (1819–1914), French philosopher and writer
 Conrad Hal Waddington (1905–75), British biologist who developed the theory of epigenetics
 Charlotte Mary Waddington (1907–2002), British journalist wrote as Mary Stott
 David Waddington (Essex), Member of Parliament (MP) for Maldon 1847–52 and for Harwich 1852–56
 David Waddington, Baron Waddington (1929–2017), English Conservative Party politician, Home Secretary 1989–90
 Edward Waddington (1670 or 1671 – 1731), bishop of Chichester, England
 George Waddington (1793–1869), English traveller and church historian
 John Waddington (disambiguation), various people of this name:
 John Waddington (cleric) (1810–80), English congregational cleric
 John Waddington (cricketer, born 1918) (1918–85), South African cricketer
 John Waddington (footballer) (born 1938), Australian rules footballer
 John Waddington Limited, card and board game company named for one of its founders
 Mary Alsop King Waddington (1833–1923), American author
 Michael Waddington (born 1974), American military criminal defense attorney
 Miriam Waddington (1917–2004), Canadian poet
 Patricia Waddington (Fothergill, previously Ambler), Scottish roboticist
 Patrick Waddington (1903–87), British actor
 Paul Waddington (1893 - ?), World War I flying ace
 Tad Waddington (born 1962), American author and statistician
 Sheila Waddington (née Sheila Willcox; b. 1937), the first woman equestrian in the UK to achieve international success
 Steve Waddington, an English footballer
 Steven Waddington, an English film and television actor 
 Sue Waddington (born 1944), British politician
 Tony Waddington (songwriter) (born 1943), English singer-songwriter, record producer, film producer, screenplay writer, and creative media executive
 William of Waddington (fl. 13th c), Anglo-Norman writer
 William Henry Waddington (1826–94), Prime Minister of France

See also 
 Waddington (disambiguation), for other uses
 Waddingtons, card and board game company named for one of its founders
 Wadding (surname)

References

Surnames
English-language surnames
Surnames of English origin
Surnames of British Isles origin